Dante Alfred Magnani (March 16, 1917 – December 23, 1985) was an American football player who played nine seasons in the National Football League. Magnani, a running back, played college football for the St. Mary's College Galloping Gaels in Moraga, California.

External links
DANTE MAGNANI The New York Times obit

1917 births
1985 deaths
People from Dalzell, Illinois
Players of American football from Illinois
American football running backs
Cleveland Rams players
Chicago Bears players
Los Angeles Rams players
Detroit Lions players
Saint Mary's Gaels football players